Tuscarawas County is a county located in the northeastern part of the U.S. state of Ohio. As of the 2020 census, the population was 93,263. Its county seat is New Philadelphia. Its name is a Delaware Indian word variously translated as "old town" or "open mouth". Tuscarawas County comprises the New Philadelphia–Dover, OH Micropolitan Statistical Area, which is also included in the Cleveland–Akron–Canton, OH Combined Statistical Area.

History
For years, European-American colonists on the East Coast did not know much about the territory west of the Appalachian Mountains except for reports from a few explorers and fur traders who ventured into the area. In 1750, Christopher Gist of the Ohio Land Company explored the Tuscarawas Valley. His report of the area hinted at some natural riches and friendly American Indians.

In 1761 Moravian missionaries set out from Bethlehem, Pennsylvania, to set up a mission in the Tuscarawas Valley.  Christian Frederick Post, David Zeisberger, and John Heckewelder met with Chief Netawatwees of the western Delaware Indians, also known as the "Lenape". He invited them to the tribal village he had founded, Gekelemukpechunk (present-day Newcomerstown, Ohio). He granted the missionaries permission to build a cabin near the junction of the Sandy Creek and Tuscarawas River, in present-day Stark County and begin evangelizing the natives. While they were successful in baptizing dozens of converts, they were forced to abandon the mission in 1763 during the French and Indian War (part of the Seven Years' War).

Again, at the request of Chief Netawatwees in 1771, David Zeisberger returned to found additional missions in the Tuscarawas Valley. In the spring of 1772, near the present site of New Philadelphia, Ohio, Zeisberger, along with five converted Indian families established the mission of Schoenbrunn (beautiful spring), also known as Welhik Tuppeek (best spring). They built a school house and a chapel. In August of that year, John Heckawelder brought an additional 250 converted Christian Delawares into the village.

In late summer 1772, they established a second settlement, roughly 10 miles away from Schoenbrunn, called Gnadenhütten (cabins of grace). On October 17, 1772, Zeisberger conducted the first religious service at Gnadenhutten. In 1776, Chief Netawatwes donated land for another settlement, Lichtenau (meadow of light), near present-day Coshocton, then the principal Delaware village in the region.

The American Revolutionary War brought the demise of these first settlements. The Delawares, who at the time populated much of eastern Ohio, were divided over their loyalties, with many in the west allied with the British out of Fort Detroit and many in the east allied with the Americans out of Fort Pitt. Delawares were involved in skirmishes against both sides, but by 1781 the American sense was that the Delawares were allying with the British. In response, Colonel Daniel Brodhead of the American forces led an expedition out of Fort Pitt and on 19 April 1781 destroyed the settlement of Coshocton. Surviving residents fled to the north. Colonel Brodhead's forces left the Delawares at the other Moravian mission villages unmolested, but the actions set the stage for raised tensions in the area.

In September 1781, British forces and Indian allies, primarily Wyandot and Delaware, forced the Christian Indians and missionaries from the remaining Moravian villages. The Indian allies took their prisoners further west toward Lake Erie to a new village, called Captive Town, on the Sandusky River. The British took the missionaries David Zeisberger and John Heckewelder under guard back to Fort Detroit, where the two men were tried (but eventually acquitted) on charges of treason against the British Crown.

The Indians at Captive Town were going hungry because of insufficient rations, and in February 1782, more than 100 returned to their old Moravian villages to harvest the crops and collect the stored food they had been forced to leave behind. In early March 1782, 160 Pennsylvania militia led by Lieutenant Colonel David Williamson raided the villages and garrisoned the Indians in the village of Gnadenhütten, accusing them of taking part in raids into Pennsylvania. Although the Delawares rejected the charges as they were pacifist Christians, the militia held a council and voted to kill them. The next morning on 8 March, the militia tied up the Indians, stunned them with mallet blows to the head, and killed them with fatal scalping cuts. In all, the militia murdered and scalped 28 men, 29 women, and 39 children. They piled the bodies of the Moravian Christian Lenape and Moravian Christian Mahicans in the mission buildings and burned the village down. They also burned the other abandoned Moravian villages in the area.

This action, which came to be known as the Gnadenhutten massacre, caused an outright frontier war to break out between the Delawares and the Americans. After several years of ongoing campaigns by the natives to terrorize and keep out further American settlers, a brutal campaign by US General "Mad Anthony" Wayne from Fort Washington (now Cincinnati) was carried out in late 1793, eventually resulting in the Treaty of Greenville being signed in 1795 between the US government and the local natives. The Treaty ceded the eastern ⅔ of current-day Ohio to white settlers and once again opened up the territory for white settlement.

In October, 1798, David Zeisberger, the same Moravian missionary who had founded many of the original missions in the 1770s, returned to the Tuscarawas Valley to found a new mission, Goshen, from where he continued his work to evangelize the local natives with the Christian gospel. Over the next several years, farmer settlers from Pennsylvania came trickling into the area, and by 1808, the first permanent settlement, New Philadelphia, was founded near the Goshen mission. After the War of 1812, Goshen declined as a mission until it was disbanded in 1824.

Tuscarawas County was formed from Muskingum County on Feb. 15, 1808.

In the late 1820s, Tuscarawas County was chosen to be on the route of the Ohio and Erie Canal, a man-made waterway linking Lake Erie (via Cleveland) to the Ohio River (via Portsmouth, Ohio).  Construction from Massillon, Ohio to Canal Dover, Ohio was completed in 1829.  Construction from Canal Dover, Ohio to Newark, Ohio was completed in 1830.  A total of 15 locks were built in Tuscarawas County, entering the county line on an aqueduct north of Zoar, Ohio on Lock 7 to Newcomerstown, Ohio, exiting the county below Lock 21.  In 1848, the feeder Sandy and Beaver Canal was completed, linking Bolivar, Ohio to the Ohio River at Glasgow, Pennsylvania.  With the rise of railroads, and a massive flood in 1913, the canal system was abandoned.  Three years later, the city of Canal Dover shortened its name Dover to 1916.

Geography

Adjacent counties
 Stark County (north)
 Carroll County (northeast)
 Harrison County (southeast)
 Guernsey County (south)
 Coshocton County (southwest)
 Holmes County (northwest)

Demographics

2000 census
As of the census of 2000, there were 90,914 people, 35,653 households, and 25,313 families residing in the county. The population density was 160 people per square mile (62/km2). There were 38,113 housing units at an average density of 67 per square mile (26/km2). The racial makeup of the county was 97.87% White, 0.73% Black or African American, 0.17% Native American, 0.24% Asian, 0.05% Pacific Islander, 0.21% from other races, and 0.73% from two or more races. Hispanic or Latino of any race were 0.71% of the population. 95.3% spoke English, 1.3% German and 1.1% Spanish as their first language.

There were 35,653 households, out of which 32.30% had children under the age of 18 living with them, 58.10% were married couples living together, 9.30% had a female householder with no husband present, and 29.00% were non-families. 24.90% of all households were made up of individuals, and 11.50% had someone living alone who was 65 years of age or older. The average household size was 2.52 and the average family size was 3.01.

In the county, the age distribution of the population shows 25.40% under the age of 18, 8.00% from 18 to 24, 28.10% from 25 to 44, 23.60% from 45 to 64, and 15.00% who were 65 years of age or older. The median age was 38 years. For every 100 females there were 95.10 males. For every 100 females age 18 and over, there were 91.40 males.

The median income for a household in the county was $35,489, and the median income for a family was $41,677. Males had a median income of $31,963 versus $20,549 for females. The per capita income for the county was $17,276. About 7.20% of families and 9.40% of the population were below the poverty line, including 12.20% of those under age 18 and 7.80% of those age 65 or over.

2010 census
As of the 2010 United States Census, there were 92,582 people, 36,965 households, and 25,318 families residing in the county. The racial makeup of the county was 96.6% white, 0.8% black or African American, 0.3% Asian, 0.3% American Indian, 0.2% Pacific islander, 0.7% from other races, and 1.2% from two or more races. Those of Hispanic or Latino origin made up 1.9% of the population. In terms of ancestry, 38.0% were German, 16.0% were Irish, 10.9% were English, 7.7% were American, and 7.6% were Italian. 94.7% spoke English, 1.4% Spanish, 1.1% German, and 2.0% another West Germanic language.

Of the 36,965 households, 30.6% had children under the age of 18 living with them, 54.0% were married couples living together, 9.8% had a female householder with no husband present, 31.5% were non-families, and 26.6% of all households were made up of individuals. The average household size was 2.47 and the average family size was 2.97. The median age was 40.9 years.

The median income for a household in the county was $42,081 and the median income for a family was $51,330. Males had a median income of $40,490 versus $27,193 for females. The per capita income for the county was $20,536. About 9.2% of families and 12.8% of the population were below the poverty line, including 17.7% of those under age 18 and 10.2% of those age 65 or over.

Politics

Prior to 1912, Tuscarawas County was a Democratic Party stronghold in presidential elections. But starting with the 1912 election, the county has become a bellwether county, only backing losing candidates in 1960, 1968, 2012 and 2020.

|}

Communities

Cities
 Dover
 New Philadelphia (county seat)
 Uhrichsville

Villages

 Baltic
 Barnhill
 Bolivar
 Dennison
 Gnadenhutten
 Midvale
 Mineral City
 Newcomerstown
 Parral
 Port Washington
 Roswell
 Schoenbrunn
 Stone Creek
 Strasburg
 Sugarcreek
 Tuscarawas
 Zoar

Townships

 Auburn
 Bucks
 Clay
 Dover
 Fairfield
 Franklin
 Goshen
 Jefferson
 Lawrence
 Mill
 Oxford
 Perry
 Rush
 Salem
 Sandy
 Sugar Creek
 Union
 Warren
 Warwick
 Washington
 Wayne
 York

https://web.archive.org/web/20160715023447/http://www.ohiotownships.org/township-websites

Census-designated places
 Dundee
 Sandyville
 Wilkshire Hills

Unincorporated communities

 Barrs Mills
 Bernice
 Blackband
 Columbia
 Eastport
 Gilmore
 Glasgow
 Goshen
 Hartwood
 Lock Seventeen
 Mount Tabor
 New Cumberland
 Newport
 Peoli
 Postboy
 Ragersville
 Rockford
 Schoenbrunn
 Somerdale
 Stillwater
 Wainwright
 West Chester
 Winfield
 Wolf
 Yorktown
 Zoarville

Notable people
 Samuel G. Cosgrove, sixth Governor of the state of Washington
 William Clarke Quantrill, Confederate guerrilla leader during the American Civil War.
 Cy Young, Major League Baseball Hall of Famer
 Woody Hayes, former Ohio State football coach.

See also
 National Register of Historic Places listings in Tuscarawas County, Ohio

References

Further reading
 J.W. Cummins and Earl E. Sanderson, The Water Resources of Tuscarawas County, Ohio. Columbus, OH: Ohio Water Resources Board, 1947.
 C. Edward DeGraw, The Only Game in Town: A History of Baseball in Tuscarawas County, Ohio, 1867-1955. Tuscarawas County Historical Society, c. 1998.
 Federal Writers Project, Guide to Tuscarawas County. New Philadelphia, OH: Tucker Printing Co., 1939.
 Henry Howe, History of Tuscarawas County, Ohio, 1808-1889. Knightstown, IN: Bookmark, 1977.
 Herbert P Lohrman and Ralph H Romig, Valley of the Tuscarawas: A History of Tuscarawas County. Dover, OH: Ohio Hills Publishers, 1972.
 J.B. Mansfield, The History of Tuscarawas County, Ohio: Containing a History of the County; Its Townships, Towns, Churches, Schools, etc.; General and Local Statistics; Military Record; Portraits of Early Settlers and Prominent Men; History of the Northwest Territory; History of Ohio; Miscellaneous Matters, etc., etc. Chicago: Warner, Beers & Co., 1884.
 Fred Miller, Tuscarawas County, Ohio. Charleston, SC: Arcadia, 2000.
 Lloyd E. Mizer, History of the Schools in Tuscarawas County, Ohio. n.c.: Ohio Retired Teachers Association. Tuscarawas County Chapter, 1993.
 Ohio Retired Teachers Association, Tuscarawas County Chapter, History of Early Tuscarawas County Schools. New Philadelphia, OH: Printing Dept., Buckeye Joint Vocational School, 1978.
 Earl P. Olmstead, A Documentary History of the Ohio & Erie Canal, Tuscarawas County, Ohio. New Philadelphia, OH: Tuscarawas County Historical Society and the Tusc-Kent Archives, Kent State University, 1996.
 Edwin S. Rhodes, The Centennial History and Atlas of Tuscarawas County, Ohio, 1908. New Philadelphia, OH: Tuscarawas Centennial Association, 1908.
 Julius Miller Richardson, A Brief History of Tuscarawas County, Ohio. n.c.: n.p., n.d. [1990s].
 Tuscarawas County Genealogical Society, Tuscarawas County, Ohio Cemeteries. New Philadelphia, OH: Tuscarawas County Genealogical Society, 1981.

External links
 Tuscarawas County Government's website
 Tuscarawas County Convention & Visitors Bureau's website
 Kent State University The Olmstead Collection, Tuscarawas County Historical Society
 Ohio and Erie Canal National Heritage Corridor, a National Park Service Discover Our Shared Heritage Travel Itinerary

 
Appalachian Ohio
Counties of Appalachia
1808 establishments in Ohio
Populated places established in 1808